"Skrting on the Surface" is a song by the English rock band the Smile. It was released on 17 March 2022 as the third single from the Smile's debut album, A Light for Attracting Attention. It features guitar arpeggios in the time signature . The singer, Thom Yorke, and the guitarist, Jonny Greenwood, developed it from an earlier unreleased song by their band Radiohead.

History 
Variations on the title phrase appeared on the Radiohead website around the time of their album OK Computer (1997). The Radiohead singer Thom Yorke first performed "Skrting on the Surface" in 2009 in a solo piano rendition while touring with his band Atoms for Peace. In 2012, Radiohead performed a different arrangement, which Pitchfork described as "a bleak slow-groover".

In 2021, Yorke and the Radiohead guitarist Jonny Greenwood announced a new band, the Smile, with the drummer Tom Skinner. Skinner said "Skrting on the Surface" was one of the first songs they worked on, and developed from Greenwood's  guitar line; Yorke realised that the earlier song "fit perfectly on top". Skinner recorded his drums in a single take, creating "air of spontaneity". The song was recorded by Radiohead's producer Nigel Godrich in his studio in London.

The Smile debuted their version of the song, then titled "Skating on the Surface", in a surprise performance for Live at Worthy Farm, a live video produced by Glastonbury Festival and streamed on May 22, 2021. The single was released on 17 March 2022.

Music video
The video for "Skrting on the Surface" was directed by Mark Jenkin, who also directed the video for the Smile's previous single, "The Smoke". The video was shot on 16 mm film in the Rosevale Tin Mine in Cornwall, England. Water from the mine was used to develop the film by hand. The video was filmed during Storm Eunice and Storm Franklin; the crew were "blissfully unaware" of the damage done by the storm while they worked underground.

Reception
The Fader journalist Jordan Darville called the song "an unabashed channeling of what has made Greenwood and Yorke's creative partnership so successful over the course of many decades". The Rolling Stone journalist Daniel Kreps said Skinner's drumming and Greenwood's arpeggios gave the song "a technicolour makeover" in comparison to the earlier versions.

Track listing
The song, on specific streaming services and digital storefronts, also contains the two previously released singles from the band:

Personnel
Credits adapted from album liner notes.

The Smile
Thom Yorke - vocals, bass
Jonny Greenwood - guitar, bass
Tom Skinner - drums

Production
Nigel Godrich

Additional musicians
 London Contemporary Orchestra
 Hugh Brunt – orchestration
 Eloisa-Fleur Thom – violin
 Alessandro Ruisi – violin
 Zara Benyounes – violin
 Sophie Mather – violin
 Agata Daraskaite – violin
 Charlotte Bonneton – violin
 Zoe Matthews – viola
 Clifton Harrison – viola
 Oliver Coates – cello
 Max Ruisi – cello
 Clare O’Connell – cello
 Jason Yarde – saxophone
 Robert Stillman – saxophone
 Chelsea Carmichael – flute
 Nathaniel Cross – trombone
 Byron Wallen – trumpet
 Theon Cross – tuba
 Tom Herbert – double bass
 Dave Brown – double bass

References

2022 songs
Songs written by Jonny Greenwood
Songs written by Thom Yorke
Song recordings produced by Nigel Godrich
The Smile songs